Svyatoy Nos (Святой Нос 'Holy Cape') is the name of several localities in Russia:

In the Kola Peninsula, Northwest Russia:
Svyatoy Nos, Murmansk Oblast, a town
Cape Svyatoy Nos, Murmansk Oblast

In the Lake Baikal, Republic of Buryatia:
Svyatoy Nos, Buryatia, an administrative division
Svyatoy Nos Peninsula, Buryatia

In the Nenets Autonomous Okrug, North Russia:
Cape Svyatoy Nos, Nenets Autonomous Okrug

In the Sakha Republic (Yakutia), North Siberia:
Cape Svyatoy Nos (Laptev Sea)